Soft Cushions is a 1927 American comedy film directed by Edward F. Cline and featuring Boris Karloff. It is a comic take by actor and producer Douglas MacLean on the 1911  play Kismet and the 1920 silent film adaptation. It is listed as being lost by Arne Andersen's Lost Film Files website.

Cast
 Douglas MacLean as The Young Thief
 Sue Carol as The Girl
 Richard Carle as The Slave Dealer
 Russ Powell as The Fat Thief (as Russell Powell)
 Frank Leigh as The Lean Thief
 Wade Boteler as The Police Judge
 Nigel De Brulier as The Notary
 Albert Prisco as The Wazir
 Boris Karloff as The Chief Conspirator
 Albert Gran as The Sultan
 Fred Kelsey as Policeman
 Harry L. Fraser as The Citizen (as Harry Jones)
 Noble Johnson as The Captain of the Guard

See also
 Boris Karloff filmography

References

External links

1927 films
1927 comedy films
1927 lost films
American silent feature films
American black-and-white films
Silent American comedy films
Films directed by Edward F. Cline
Paramount Pictures films
Lost American films
Lost comedy films
1920s American films